Self Portrait is a work by graffiti artist Banksy. In 2007, it sold for 198,000 pounds, nearly five times its estimated pre-sale value.

References

Works by Banksy